Forum of Mathematics, Pi and Forum of Mathematics, Sigma are open-access peer-reviewed journals for mathematics published under a creative commons license by Cambridge University Press. 
The founding managing editor was Rob Kirby. He was succeeded by Robert Guralnick, who is currently the managing editor of both journals.

Forum of Mathematics, Pi publishes articles of interest to a wide audience of mathematicians, while Forum of Mathematics, Sigma is intended for more specialized articles, with clusters of editors in different areas of mathematics.

Abstracting and indexing
Both journals are abstracted and indexed in Science Citation Index Expanded, MathSciNet, and Scopus.

References

External links
 A new open-access venture from Cambridge University Press, Tim Gowers, 2 July 2012
 Forum of Mathematics, Pi and Forum of Mathematics, Sigma, Terry Tao, 2 July 2012
 The Forum of Mathematics, blessing or curse?, Peter Krautzberger, 11 November 2012

Cambridge University Press academic journals
Creative Commons Attribution-licensed journals
English-language journals
Mathematics education in the United Kingdom
Mathematics journals